The 2017 Tour La Provence was a road cycling stage race that took place between 21 and 23 February 2017. The race was rated as a 2.1 event as part of the 2017 UCI Europe Tour, and was the second edition of the Tour La Provence.

Geniez completed the podium, a further two seconds in arrears, after a tie-break with  rider Jonathan Hivert.

Dennis also won the points classification as the most consistent finisher over the three days, with Geniez winning the multi-coloured jersey for the best cumulative placings in the general, points and mountains classifications.  rider Jan Polanc was the winner of the mountains classification, while the young rider classification was claimed by Geniez's teammate Léo Vincent, finishing 15th overall.

Teams
Eighteen teams were invited to start the race. These included four UCI WorldTeams, six UCI Professional Continental teams, seven UCI Continental teams and a French national team.

Route

Stages

Stage 1
21 February 2017 — Aubagne to Istres,

Stage 2
22 February 2017 — Miramas to La Ciotat,

Stage 3
23 February 2017 — Aix-en-Provence to Marseille,

Classification leadership table
In the 2017 Tour La Provence, four different jerseys were awarded for the main classifications. For the general classification, calculated by adding each cyclist's finishing times on each stage, the leader received a blue jersey. This classification was considered the most important of the 2017 Tour La Provence, and the winner of the classification was considered the winner of the race.

Additionally, there was a points classification, which awarded a green jersey. In the points classification, cyclists received points for finishing in the top 15 in a mass-start stage. For winning a stage, a rider earned 25 points, with 20 for second, 16 for third, 13 for fourth, 11 for fifth with a point fewer per place down to a single point for 15th place. Points towards the classification could also be accrued at intermediate sprint points during each stage. There was also a mountains classification, the leadership of which was marked by a red jersey. In the mountains classification, points were won by reaching the top of a climb before other cyclists, with more points available for the higher-categorised climbs. The fourth jersey represented the young rider classification, marked by a white jersey. This was decided in the same way as the general classification, but only riders born after 1 January 1994 were eligible to be ranked in the classification.

Additional jerseys were also awarded for the best rider in the overall classification from the Provence region (grey jersey), the most combative rider (black jersey) and the rider placed highest cumulatively across the general, points and mountains classification (multi-coloured jersey).

References

External links

2017
2017 UCI Europe Tour
2017 in French sport
February 2017 sports events in France